Der Spatz vom Wallrafplatz (engl.:The Sparrow of Wallraf Place) was a German television series which was aired by German public broadcaster Westdeutscher Rundfunk from 1969 to 1976. The show centers around the adventures of a sparrow which lives on a platanus tree on Wallraf Place in the heart of Cologne, close to the Westdeutscher Rundfunk building, Germany's biggest public broadcaster. While the scenes were shot at actual locations on Wallrafplatz and other places in Cologne, the sparrow was "played" by a Marionette and on one occasion, by a stick puppet.

See also 
 List of German television series

References

External links 
 

German television shows featuring puppetry
German children's television series
1960s German television series
1969 German television series debuts
1976 German television series endings
Television shows set in Cologne
German-language television shows
Das Erste original programming